Gregori J. Martin (born Gregorio Barbieri Jr. on May 6, 1978) is a television producer, director, and the founder, CEO, and chairman of LANY Entertainment (formerly known as LANYfilms Productions) an independent bi-coastal entertainment company. Martin is best known for his digital drama series The Bay, for which he won the 2015 Daytime Emmy Award for Outstanding New Approaches Drama Series and the 2016, 2017, and 2018 Daytime Emmy Awards for Outstanding Digital Daytime Drama Series.  Martin is also known for the theatrically released independent vampire thriller Raven, a feature film produced by GruntWorks Entertainment where he originally served as a producer, director and as president for approximately four years. Martin is currently in development on a six-hour miniseries titled The Disciples that was sold to Sony Entertainment and serves as co-executive producer and head writer of the made-for-TV miniseries. Martin also serves as co-executive producer and director of the Daytime Emmy-nominated situation comedy This Just In for Associated Television International (ATI).  Martin was awarded the 2011 Indie Series Award for Outstanding Directing for his work on The Bay and was again nominated in 2016, 2017, and 2018.

Career
Around 2000, Martin wrote and produced several experimental projects and TV pilots including Waterfront, directed by Richard J. Lewis. In the Spring of 2005 he made his directorial debut for the stage with Crucify!, a self-written original play following the crucifixion and resurrection of Jesus of Nazareth. It was at that time he turned to directing films.

In 2006, Martin directed, wrote and produced two feature motion pictures,  His first film MARy, an indie horror film based on the urban legend Bloody Mary, shot on location in Los Angeles County. Relocating to the East Coast, he began production as a producer, director, and co-writer of Manhattanites, a feature dramedy starring several Emmy-nominated stars from the ABC and CBS daytime soap operas.

In 2007, Martin moved back to Los Angeles, where he wrote, produced, and directed a passion project called Skeletons in the Desert, It was this project that brought Martin to collaborate with GruntWorks Entertainment where he helped manage and control all aspects of production for four years.  With GruntWorks, Martin directed and co-produced the film Jack Rio, screened at the Terror Film Festival in Philadelphia, Pennsylvania. Additional Gruntworks collaborations include The Intruders and Sebastian.

Martin completed his tenth feature film, The Southside, based on the true story and tragic death of his cousin, Robert Areizaga Jr.  Currently in post-production, Martin's eleventh feature film, A Place Called Hollywood, is a satire that tells the cutting-edge story of a young man who pursues his dream in becoming a famous actor and gives a glimpse of the harsher side of Hollywood. In 2013, Martin served as a story consultant and behind the scenes producer for the TV Guide Network (TVGN) documentary Who Shot the Daytime Soap?

Martin has also appeared as an actor, performing in various television and film roles including an appearance as a police officer on ABC's General Hospital, as a terrorist on PAX-TV in The Heroes of Flight 93, in the supporting role of "Jack" in the indie feature motion picture comedy Amber Sunrise, and multiple supporting and cameo roles in his films. Lights Out, a screenplay of Martin's, is in production by the independent film company Mystery Inc. Entertainment.

Digital Drama Series
Martin is the creator, writer, director and executive producer of the digital drama series The Bay, which premiered in September 2010.  Recognized by the National Academy of Television Arts and Sciences (NATAS), Martin has since won a 2016 Daytime Emmy Award for Outstanding Digital Daytime Drama Series for The Bay, a 2015 Daytime Emmy Award for Outstanding New Approaches Drama Series, and the 2016, 2017, and 2018 Daytime Emmy Awards for Outstanding Digital Daytime Drama Series for the series.  In 2018, Martin won the Daytime Emmy Award for Outstanding Directing in a Digital Drama Series for his work on  The Bay, Martin was previously nominated in 2012 for Outstanding Special Class Short Format Daytime for The Bay.

The Bay was featured in the September 20–26, 2010 issue of TV Guide as Top Shows Worth Watching in 2010–2011. In December 2010, Martin was named by We Love Soaps as one of the 15 Most Fascinating People of 2010 for the creation of the series.

Personal life
Martin resides in Hollywood, California. He is a native New Yorker and father of two children, Dante Aleksander (born 2001)  and Isabella Rain (born 2008).

Filmography

Producer / Director / Screenwriter 
 Manhattanites (2008)
 Jack Rio (2008)
 MARy (2008)
 Skeletons in the Desert (2008)
 The Intruders (2009)
 Raven (2009)
 Lights Out (2010)
 Sebastian (2011)
 The Southside (2015) 
 Place Called Hollywood (2015)
The Last Whistle (2018)
FraXtur (2018)
Class Act (2019)
The Bay (98 episodes, 2010–2017) (TV)

Film actor
 Better Living (1998) as Teen Neighbor
 The Hole (2000) as Green
 Big Apple (2002) as Gigilo G
 The Guru (2002) as Devout Follower
 Amber Sunrise (2006) as Jack
 Spiritual Warriors (2007) as Resident of Atlantis
 Manhattanites (2008) as Charlie Dean
 Jack Rio (2008) as Dante Abrams
 MARy (2008) as Priest
 Skeletons in the Desert (2008) as David Grey
 The Intruders (2009) as Bartender
 Raven (2009) as Dr. Ahn
 Lights Out (2010) as Soap Actor
 Sebastian (2011) as Officer Castillo
 The Southside (2015) as Detective Velez

Television actor 
 Get a Life (1 episode, 1997)
 The $treet (1 episode, 2000) as Carlos
 Law & Order (1 episode, 2001) as Det. Vic Perez
 Oz (1 episode, 2002) as Inmate
 Grey's Anatomy (1 episode, 2005) as Orderly
 The Heroes of Flight 93 (2006) as Ahmed Al Nami
 General Hospital (6 episodes, 2005–2006) as Police Officer
 The Bay (2 episodes, 2012–2014) (TV) as P.I. Clark

References

External links
 
 

1978 births
Male actors from New York (state)
American male film actors
American male soap opera actors
Living people
People from Yonkers, New York
Film producers from New York (state)
American male screenwriters
Film directors from New York (state)
Screenwriters from New York (state)
American writers of Italian descent
American people of Puerto Rican descent
American people of Italian descent